Beal is an extinct town in southeastern Shannon County, in the U.S. state of Missouri. The GNIS classifies it as a populated place. The community sits above the south bank of the Current River. The Beal State Conservation Area lies adjacent to the south.

A post office called Beal was established in 1922, and remained in operation until 1932. William Beal, an early postmaster, gave the community his last name.

References

Ghost towns in Missouri
Ghost towns in Shannon County, Missouri